Bruno Bernabei (30 May 1888 – 23 December 1947) was an Italian politician.

Bernabei was born in Rapolano Terme. He represented the Italian Republican Party in the Constituent Assembly of Italy in 1947.

References

1888 births
1947 deaths
People from the Province of Siena
Italian Republican Party politicians
Members of the Constituent Assembly of Italy
Politicians of Tuscany